O'Sullivan v Noarlunga Meat Ltd (No 2), was a High Court of Australia case, in which a certificate, under s 74 of the Australian Constitution, was sought for leave to appeal to the Privy Council against the previous decision of O'Sullivan v Noarlunga Meat Ltd.

In the preceding case, it was held that the Commonwealth's extensive regulations regarding premises used for the slaughtering of livestock for export were valid under s 51(i) of the Constitution. In June 1955 the Privy Council gave special leave to appeal except to the extent they required a certificate of appeal under section 74. O'Sullivan applied to the High Court for a certificate of appeal.

Dixon CJ, Williams, Webb and Fullagar JJ wrote a joint judgment refusing a certificate of appeal stating that the policy of section 74 was to confine the decision of essentially federal questions to the High Court. McTiernan, Kitto and Taylor JJ each delivered concurring judgments.

The Privy Council took a narrower view of section 74 than the High Court, holding that the question of whether laws were inconsistent involved the application of section 109 of the Constitution and did not involve a question in relation to the constitutional powers of the Commonwealth and the States. The Privy Council dismissed the appeal, approving the earlier decision of the statutory majority of the High Court, particularly the judgment of Fullager J.

See also 

 Section 51(i) of the Australian Constitution
 Australian constitutional law

References 

 Winterton, G. et al. Australian federal constitutional law: commentary and materials, 1999. LBC Information Services, Sydney.

High Court of Australia cases
1956 in Australian law
Australian constitutional law
Trade and commerce power in the Australian Constitution cases
1956 in case law
Meat industry
History of agriculture in Australia